This is a list of Assembly Members (AMs; Welsh: Aelodau'r Cynulliad, ACau) elected to the fifth National Assembly for Wales at the 2016 election. In May 2020, the representatives were renamed to Members of the Senedd (MSs; Welsh: Aelodau o'r Senedd or ASau) in the fifth Senedd, they would be known as the fifth Senedd for the remainder of their term. From the 2021 election members would be elected under this new title of Senedd. There are a total of 60 members elected, 40 were elected from first past the post constituencies with a further 20 members being returned from five regions, each electing four AMs through mixed member proportional representation. In between elections, members of the legislature may not necessarily be of the same party or the same candidate elected in 2016.

Composition of the Assembly (Senedd from May 2020)

Assembly members by party following 2016 election (5th Assembly)

Assembly members by constituency and region following 2016 election (5th Assembly)

Changes between elections

Government formation
The May 2016 election saw the biggest ever change in the Assembly's composition. Labour dropped from 30 to 29 seats, and Plaid Cymru moved from 11 to 12 seats. The Conservatives lost 3 seats, moving from 14 seats to 11, while the Liberal Democrats dropped from 5 to 1 seat. UKIP, who had not previously had representation, gained seven AMs.

In the initial ballot for First Minister, Plaid Cymru's Leanne Wood and Labour's Carwyn Jones each gained 29 votes; a week of talks were then held. A document was produced after Plaid Cymru–Labour talks entitled "Moving Wales Forward", which detailed policy concessions in exchange for allowing Carwyn Jones to become First Minister. Labour appointed Kirsty Williams as Education Secretary, so that the minority government was a coalition between Welsh Labour and the Welsh Liberal Democrats. Plaid Cymru, the Conservatives and UKIP formed opposition groups.

In 2018, Mark Drakeford was elected to the leadership of the Welsh Labour Party and became first minister, leading a coalition government with the Liberal Democrats and an independent member.

In May 2020, the representatives were renamed to Members of the Senedd in the fifth Senedd, they would be known by this title for the remainder of their term. From the 2021 election members would be elected under this new title.

Changes in composition of the Assembly (now Senedd) between elections

CD=Changed designation

Senedd members by party prior to 2021 election (5th Senedd)

Senedd members elected by constituency and region prior to 2021 election (5th Senedd)

See also 

Third Jones ministry
First Drakeford government
2016 National Assembly for Wales election
1999 National Assembly for Wales election and Members of the 1st National Assembly for Wales
2003 National Assembly for Wales election and Members of the 2nd National Assembly for Wales
2007 National Assembly for Wales election and Members of the 3rd National Assembly for Wales
2011 National Assembly for Wales election and Members of the 4th National Assembly for Wales
2016 National Assembly for Wales election and Members of the 5th National Assembly for Wales
2021 Senedd election and Members of the 6th Senedd
List of by-elections to Senedd Cymru and List of elections to the Senedd
Senedd constituencies and electoral regions

References 

Lists of members of the Senedd